The 2016 CCT Uiseong Masters was held from March 8 to 11 at the Uiseong Curling Club in Uiseong-eup, Uiseong County, South Korea as part of the World Curling Tour. The event was held in a round robin format with a total purse of ₩ 200,000,000.

In the final, Kelsey Rocque and her team out of the Saville Community Sports Centre in Edmonton, Alberta, Canada defeated the Swiss rink of Silvana Tirinzoni from Aarau 5–1, thanks to a steal of three in the seventh end. It was Rocque's second tour win of the 2015–16 season, having won the Red Deer Curling Classic in October 2015. In the third place game, Allison Flaxey and her team from Caledon, Ontario, Canada defeated the Korean team of Kim Eun-jung from Uiseong 9–7. To reach the final, Rocque defeated Flaxey 4–2 in one semifinal and Tirinzoni upended Kim 7–5 in the other. Teams Val Sweeting, Michelle Englot, Nina Roth and Ayumi Ogasawara all reached the quarterfinals.

Teams
The teams are listed as follows:

Round-robin standings
Final round-robin standings

Round-robin results
All draw times are listed in Korean Standard Time (UTC+09:00).

Draw 1
Tuesday, March 8, 9:00 am

Draw 2
Tuesday, March 8, 2:00 pm

Draw 3
Tuesday, March 8, 7:00 pm

Draw 4
Wednesday, March 9, 9:00 am

Draw 5
Wednesday, March 9, 2:00 pm

Draw 6
Wednesday, March 9, 7:00 pm

Draw 7
Thursday, March 10, 9:00 am

Playoffs

Source:

Quarterfinals
Thursday, March 10, 2:00 pm

Thursday, March 10, 7:00 pm

Semifinals
Friday, March 11, 9:00 am

Third place game
Friday, March 11, 12:45 pm

Final
Friday, March 11, 12:45 pm

References

External links
CurlingZone
Facebook

2016 in South Korean sport
2016 in curling
March 2016 sports events in Asia
International curling competitions hosted by South Korea
Sport in North Gyeongsang Province
Uiseong County